The Federal Ministry of Marshall Plan Affairs, founded in 1949, was a ministry of the Federal Republic of Germany charged with overseeing the rebuilding of the new republic using money and aid given by the United States as part of the European Recovery Program (also called Marshall Plan).

The Ministry was renamed Ministry for Economic Cooperation in 1953. In 1957 it was transformed into the Minister for Federal Patrimony, which existed until 1969.

List of Federal Ministers

The first and only Minister was Franz Blücher (FDP and later FVP), who also was Vice Chancellor

Political Party:

Marshall Plan
Ministries established in 1949